Nino Quevedo (1929 – 24 July 2006) was a Spanish screenwriter and film director. He wrote for 17 films between 1966 and 1985.

Filmography
 Futuro imperfecto (1985)
 Vivir mañana (1983)
 Como la uña de la carne (1978)
 Suave, cariño, muy suave (1978)
 Silos, siglos (1977)
 Canción de la trilla (1975)
 Castilla eterna (1975)
 Oh tierra triste y noble (1975)
 Goya, a Story of Solitude (1971)
 Crónica en negro y oro (1970)
 Caminos de Castilla (1968)
 Encuentro con Tolaitola. Toledo árabe (1968)
 Fiesta de nieve en Castilla (1968)
 Fiesta en el Sella (1968)
 Voz y silencio del Sella (1968)
 La busca (1967)

External links

1929 births
2006 deaths
Spanish film directors
Spanish male screenwriters
Neurological disease deaths in Spain
Deaths from Parkinson's disease
20th-century Spanish screenwriters
20th-century Spanish male writers